Colonel Nicholas Joseph "Nick" Fury Sr. is a fictional character appearing in American comic books published by Marvel Comics. Created by writer/artist Jack Kirby and writer Stan Lee, he first appeared in Sgt. Fury and his Howling Commandos #1 (May 1963), a World War II combat series that portrayed the cigar-chomping man as leader of an elite U.S. Army Ranger unit.

The modern-day character, initially a CIA agent, debuted a few months later in Fantastic Four #21 (Dec. 1963). In Strange Tales #135 (Aug. 1965), the character was transformed into a James Bond-like spy and leading agent of the fictional espionage agency S.H.I.E.L.D. The character makes frequent appearances in Marvel books as the former head of S.H.I.E.L.D., and as an intermediary between the U.S. government or the United Nations and various superheroes. It is eventually revealed that he takes a special medication called the Infinity Formula that halted his aging and allows him to be active despite being nearly a century old, later leading to him becoming The Unseen, herald of Uatu the Watcher.

Nick Fury appears in several Marvel series set in alternate universes, as well as multiple animated films, television shows, and video games based on the comics. The character was first portrayed in live-action by David Hasselhoff in the television film Nick Fury: Agent of S.H.I.E.L.D. (1998), with Andre Braugher portraying General Hager, a character based on Fury, in Fantastic Four: Rise of the Silver Surfer (2007). Jeff Ward also portrayed Deke Shaw, a character based on the original Fury, from the fifth to the seventh season of Agents of S.H.I.E.L.D. (2017–20).

A version of the character appearing in Marvel's 2001 Ultimate Marvel imprint was based on Samuel L. Jackson's appearance and screen persona. When the character was introduced in the Marvel Cinematic Universe in 2008's Iron Man, Jackson was cast in the role, which he has played in eleven films, the first season of Agents of S.H.I.E.L.D. (2013–14), the animated series What If...? (2021), and the television series Secret Invasion (2023).  The recognizability of the character portrayed by Jackson in the films later led Marvel in 2012 to retire the original character in the comic book continuity, replacing him with his son Nick Fury Jr., who is also patterned on Jackson.

Publication history

Sgt. Fury and his Howling Commandos 

Fury first appeared in the World War II combat series Sgt. Fury and his Howling Commandos, as the cigar-chomping NCO who led a racially and ethnically integrated elite unit. The series ran 167 issues (May 1963–Dec. 1981), though only in reprints after issue #120 (July 1974). Following several issues by creators Lee and Kirby, penciller Dick Ayers began his long stint on what would be his signature series; John Severin later joined as inker, forming a long-running, critically acclaimed team. Roy Thomas succeeded Lee as writer, followed by Gary Friedrich, whom became a signature series as well. Annuals featured the "Howlers" called back to fight in the Korean War and Vietnam War.

The Howling Commandos encountered Office of Strategic Services agent Reed Richards (later Mister Fantastic of the Fantastic Four) in #3 (Sept. 1963), and fought alongside Captain America and Bucky in #13 (Dec. 1964).

Strange Tales and solo series 

In Strange Tales #135 (Aug. 1965), Fury, now a colonel, became a James Bond-esque Cold War spy, with Marvel introducing the covert organization S.H.I.E.L.D. (Supreme Headquarters International Espionage Law-enforcement Division) and its nemesis Hydra.

The 12-page feature was initially created by Lee and Kirby, with the latter supplying such inventive and enduring gadgets and hardware as the Helicarrier — an airborne aircraft carrier — as well as human-replicant LMDs (Life Model Decoys), and even automobile airbags. Lee recalled in 2005,

Writer-penciller-colorist Jim Steranko began on the feature in Strange Tales #151 (Dec. 1966), initially over Kirby layouts. He quickly became one of comic books' most acclaimed and influential artists. In some of the creative zeniths of the Silver Age, Steranko established the feature as one of comic books' most groundbreaking and innovative. He popularized in comic books such art movements of the day as psychedelia and op art; built on Kirby's longstanding work in photomontage; and created comic books' first four-page spread. All the while, he spun plots of intense intrigue, barely hidden sensuality, and hi-fi hipness—and supplied his own version of Bond girls, pushing what was allowable under the Comics Code at the time.

The 12-page feature ran through Strange Tales #168 (sharing that "split book" with the occult feature "Doctor Strange" each issue), after which it was spun off into its own series, titled Nick Fury, Agent of S.H.I.E.L.D. This ran 15 issues (June 1968–Nov. 1969), followed by three all-reprint issues beginning a year later (Nov. 1970–March 1971). Steranko wrote and drew issues #1–3 and #5, and drew the covers of #1–7.

Fury continued to make appearances in the other Marvel books, from Fantastic Four to The Avengers. In 1972, Sgt. Fury and His Howling Commandos celebrated its 100th issue with a present-day reunion of the squad, sponsored by Stan Lee and the creative team behind the title. (Lee, like other comic books professionals, has made occasional cameos in his own books, in a tradition going back to the 1940s Golden Age of Comic Books). The matter of Fury apparently not aging significantly since his term of service in World War II was justified in "Assignment: The Infinity Formula" by the writer Jim Starlin and artist Howard Chaykin in Marvel Spotlight #31 (Dec. 1976), revealing Fury's age-retarding medication treatment.

A six-issue miniseries, Nick Fury vs. S.H.I.E.L.D. (June–Nov. 1988) was followed by Nick Fury, Agent of S.H.I.E.L.D.  vol. 2. The latter series lasted 47 issues (Sept. 1989–May 1993); its pivotal story arc was "the Deltite Affair", in which many S.H.I.E.L.D. agents were replaced with Life Model Decoys in a takeover attempt.

A year after that series ended, the one-shot Fury (May 1994), using retroactive continuity, altered the events of those previous two series. The Fury one-shot had cast them as a series of staged events designed to distract Fury from the resurrection plans of HYDRA head Baron von Strucker. The following year, writer Chaykin and penciller Corky Lehmkuhl produced the four-issue miniseries Fury of S.H.I.E.L.D. (April–July 1995). Various publications have additionally focused on Nick Fury's solo adventures, such as the graphic novels and one-shots Wolverine/Nick Fury: The Scorpio Connection (1989), Wolverine/Nick Fury: Scorpio Rising (Oct. 1994), Fury/Black Widow: Death Duty and Captain America and Nick Fury: Blood Truce (both Feb. 1995), and Captain America and Nick Fury: The Otherworld War (Oct. 2001). He starred in the 2004–2005 Secret War miniseries.

In the 2018 Exiles series "The Unseen" will recruit characters to combat an unknown galactic threat.

Fictional character biography

Early life and wartime 
Nicholas Joseph Fury is the eldest of three children born to Jack Fury in New York City. His father is a United States citizen who enlists in the United Kingdom's Royal Flying Corps during World War I. Jack enlists in 1916 and is stationed in France. He shoots down Manfred von Richthofen early in his flying career, and is a highly decorated combat aviator by the end of the War in 1918.

Discharged after the War, Jack returns home, marries an unnamed woman, and becomes the father of three children. Nick, probably born in the late 1910s or early 1920s, is followed by Jacob "Jake" Fury (later the supervillain Scorpio who co-founded the Zodiac cartel), and their sister, Dawn.

All three children grow up in the neighborhood known as Hell's Kitchen, Manhattan, New York. Nick is an amateur boxer through the New York City Police Athletic League where he learns marksmanship. As a teenager in 1937, he went overseas for the first time to fight with the International Brigades in the Spanish Civil War. He was on leave in Guernica when the fascists bombed it.

After he returns to America, Fury and his friend Red Hargrove leave the neighborhood to pursue their dreams of adventure, eventually settling on a daring wing walking and parachuting act. In the early 1940s, their death-defying stunts catch the attention of Lieutenant Samuel "Happy Sam" Sawyer, who was then training with the British Commandos, who enlists them for a special mission in the Netherlands. Nick and Red later join the U.S. Army, with Fury undergoing Basic Training under Sergeant Bass. Nick and Red are stationed together at Schofield Barracks, Hawaii when the Imperial Japanese Navy ambushes the base on December 7, 1941. Red is among the many killed in the attack on Pearl Harbor, with Fury swearing vengeance against both the Japanese and the Nazis.

Sawyer, now a captain, assigns Fury command of the First Attack Squad, a unit of U.S. Army Rangers, who are awarded the honorary title of Commandos by Winston Churchill after their first missions. They are nicknamed the "Howling Commandos" and stationed at a military base in the United Kingdom to fight specialized missions, primarily but not exclusively in the European Theatre of World War II. During this period, Fury falls in love with a British nurse, Lady Pamela Hawley, who dies in a bombing raid on London before he can propose to her.

C.I.A. 
At the end of World War II in Europe, Fury is severely injured by a land mine in France, and is found and healed by Berthold Sternberg, who uses him as a test subject for his Infinity Formula. After making a full recovery, Fury begins working for the Office of Strategic Services (OSS), precursor of the Central Intelligence Agency (CIA). Six months into his service, he learns the extent of Sternberg's life-saving operation: the Infinity Formula has stopped his aging, but if he does not receive annual doses, he will age rapidly and die. The doctor begins a 30-year period of extorting large sums of money from Fury in exchange for the injections.

Fury segues into the CIA as an espionage agent, gathering information in Korea. During this time the Howling Commandos are reformed, and Fury receives a battlefield commission to lieutenant. He later reaches the rank of colonel. During this time, he recommends the recruitment of married agents Richard and Mary Parker, who will go on to become the parents of Fury's occasional superhero ally Spider-Man. Much later, the CIA uses him as a liaison to various super-powered groups that have begun appearing, including the Fantastic Four, whom CIA agent Fury first encounters in Fantastic Four #21 (Dec. 1963).

During his time with the CIA, Fury begins wearing his trademark eyepatch. Sgt. Fury #27 (Feb. 1966) revealed that he had taken shrapnel to one eye during World War II, which caused him to slowly lose sight in it over the course of years.

S.H.I.E.L.D. 
Fury becomes the second commander of S.H.I.E.L.D. as its Public Director. The ultimate authority of S.H.I.E.L.D. is revealed to be a cabal of 12 mysterious men and women who give Fury his orders and operational structure, leaving Fury to manage the actual implementation of these orders and stratagems. The identities of these people have never been revealed; they appear only as shaded figures on monitors. Initially, his organization's primary nemesis is the international terrorist organization Hydra, created by Fury's worst enemy of World War II, Baron Wolfgang von Strucker (after retconning of the original continuity). Under Fury, S.H.I.E.L.D. grows into one of the world's most powerful organizations, reaching covertly into national governments and forming strategic alliances with the Avengers and other superhero groups, while always maintaining independence and deniability. Fury soon becomes the superhero community's main contact when government-related information is required in order to deal with a crisis.

After years at the helm, Fury discovers that S.H.I.E.L.D. and Hydra have both fallen under the control of a group of sentient Life Model Decoy androids known as Deltites. Betrayed, Fury goes underground and is hunted by his fellow agents, many of whom are later revealed to have been replaced with Deltites. Although Fury ultimately exposes and overcomes the Deltite threat, the conflict is so destructive to S.H.I.E.L.D.'s personnel and infrastructure, and leaves Fury so disillusioned, that he disbands the agency to prevent it from again being subverted from within.

Fury rebuilds S.H.I.E.L.D. from the ground up, initially as a more streamlined agency small enough for him to personally oversee and protect from being corrupted. This new incarnation changed the acronym to stand for "Strategic Hazard Intervention, Espionage and Logistics Directorate".

Sometime later, Frank Castle, the vigilante known as the Punisher, is captured and sent to a maximum-security facility with a S.H.I.E.L.D. escort. During a hypnosis session with Doc Samson, a character named Spook interferes with the session and has the Punisher conditioned to believe Fury is responsible for the murder of the Punisher's family. An escaped Punisher eventually kills Fury, who is buried at Arlington National Cemetery. The Fury that the Punisher has "killed" is later revealed to have been a highly advanced Life Model Decoy android.

Returned to his post as S.H.I.E.L.D. director, Fury independently enlists the superheroes Captain America, Spider-Man, Luke Cage, Wolverine, Daredevil, and the Black Widow to launch a covert assault on the leadership of Latveria, which is plotting a massive attack on the U.S. One year afterward, Latveria launches a counterattack that results in Fury's removal as S.H.I.E.L.D. commander, forcing him again into hiding with numerous international warrants out for his arrest. His successors as Director of S.H.I.E.L.D. are first Maria Hill and then Tony Stark. Both Hill and Stark, keeping Fury's disappearance secret from the S.H.I.E.L.D. rank and file, use Life Model Decoys to impersonate Fury on occasion.

Fury is the only "33rd-degree" S.H.I.E.L.D. officer (meaning he is the only member of S.H.I.E.L.D., present or past, to know of the existence of 28 emergency, covert bases scattered across the globe) secretly providing the Anti-Registration faction in the subsequent superhuman civil war with bases where they can rally their forces without worrying about their Pro-Registration enemies finding them.

Secret Invasion 

During the time Fury spends in hiding, he learns that Valentina Allegra de Fontaine has been plotting to extract S.H.I.E.L.D. passcodes from him and kill him. Fury kills her first, after which she reverts to the form of an extraterrestrial shape-shifter from the hostile Skrull race, which has mounted an invasion of Earth. He recruits Spider-Woman to be his mole inside both Hydra and S.H.I.E.L.D., and to watch for further Skrull impostors. Unbeknownst to him, she's replaced shortly after by Skrull Queen Veranke herself. He later instructs former S.H.I.E.L.D. agent Daisy Johnson to recruit superpowered children of various heroes and villains to help combat the Skrull invasion; these include Phobos, the 10-year-old son of Ares and himself the young god of fear; Yo-Yo, a misunderstood mutant speedster; Hellfire, a relative of Phantom Rider with supernatural powers; Druid, a magician and son of Doctor Druid; and Stonewall, a young man who can grow bigger at will and has super strength. Fury dubs them his "Commandos".

Soon after the attack on Earth, Fury and his new team are seen counter-attacking the Skrull attack in Times Square, Manhattan. They manage to repel and kill the invaders in the area significantly, whilst saving the downed Initiative cadets and the Young Avengers. He, along with his team and the rescued heroes, are next seen working and planning their next move in one of the scattered 28 covert S.H.I.E.L.D. bases. He has been seen talking to Deadpool, while Deadpool was on a Skrull ship after pretending to join them. It is revealed that Fury hired Deadpool to infiltrate Skrull ranks by pretending to defect, with the intention of obtaining biological information of the Skrulls that Fury can use to stop them. When Deadpool attempts to transmit the data, it is intercepted by Norman Osborn.

Fury leads the survivors of the Young Avengers and Initiative back to the fight in New York, where they are joined by Thor, the new Captain America, the New Avengers and the Mighty Avengers, the Hood's gang, and the Thunderbolts, to take on Veranke's army of Super Skrulls.

When the battle is over and the real heroes are found, Nick is greeted by the real Valentina Allegra de Fontaine and Dum Dum Dugan. He gives them one look and teleports away with his Secret Warriors, not speaking to his former friends.

Dark Reign and Secret Warriors 
During an infiltration and elimination of a covert S.H.I.E.L.D. base in Chicago, Fury discovers that S.H.I.E.L.D. is, and always has been, secretly controlled by Hydra. A distraught Fury now plans to use his Secret Warriors to combat the renewed Hydra threat, spearheaded by his old nemesis, Baron Strucker. He hires the new Howling Commandos, a private military company formed by 1200 former S.H.I.E.L.D. agents who refused to join Norman Osborn's H.A.M.M.E.R., to employ them in his fight against Hydra and Osborn. He has a number of inside men to assist in his raids, including Natasha Romanova posing as Yelena Belova who is in command of the Thunderbolts. Eventually, he and his men commandeer decommissioned Helicarriers, as well as forcing the H.A.M.M.E.R. agents at the dock to follow him. Natasha brings Songbird to Fury, but she is followed and the three are captured by the Thunderbolts. Osborn then shoots Fury in the head. It was not the real Fury who was shot, but a Life Model Decoy in his image, which the Fixer reveals to Songbird and Black Widow later after they escape the Thunderbolts.

On a solo mission soon after, Fury teams with Norman Osborn to interrogate a lower-level H.A.M.M.E.R. agent. The conversation (and materials obtained afterwards) reveal there may be an organization much like Hydra, installed in the upper levels of world governments, called "Leviathan". This organization appears to have been founded by the Soviet government for reasons as yet unclear. Fury later introduces Daisy Johnson to prominent members of the Howling Commandos including Alexander Pierce, leader of the second caterpillar team, and Mikel, Fury's son and leader of the "gray" team.

Siege 
Fury and the Secret Warriors are later summoned by Captain America to his hideout along with the New and Young Avengers, when Rogers, seeking to aid his long-time comrade Thor in his plight during the Siege of Asgard launched by Norman Osborn, gathered all his allies to strike back against Osborn and rescue Thor whilst simultaneously ending Osborn's Dark Reign. Fury insists on Phobos remaining behind due to an unwillingness for him to battle his father Ares and his youth, and later opens a wormhole aboard an ex-S.H.I.E.L.D. jet which brings the combined forces of the three teams to Oklahoma. They then intercept Norman Osborn's siege and with the help of Iron Man, who receives a variation of his suit from Speed, they shut down Norman's suit. Their victory is cut short when Sentry, now fully possessed by the Void, begins attacking them. Loki attempts to help Fury and the other heroes by empowering them with the Norn Stones, but Void kills him before long. Iron Man then uses the ex-S.H.I.E.L.D. Helicarrier as a bullet on the Void. Robert Reynolds regains control of his body and begs the Avengers to kill him. Thor refuses but ends up killing him anyway when Void begins to take over again. The Avengers are reunited, and the press declares that a new "Heroic Age" has begun.

Heroic Age 
While Fury remains underground, allowing Steve Rogers to take official command of the super-spy side of things, he remains in contact with Earth's heroes and monitors their activities. He provides the New Avengers with a special serum, created as a combination of the Super-Soldier serum and the Infinity Formula, to help Mockingbird when she was shot during a raid on a H.A.M.M.E.R. base. Fury later expends the last sample of the Infinity Formula to save Bucky's life. He remains immortal due to trace amounts of the formula in his body.

Battle Scars 
In 2012, the six-part series Battle Scars introduces Nick Fury's secret son, Sgt. Marcus Johnson who is an African American and ends up losing one eye in the series. The character has been described as looking like Samuel L. Jackson, just as the Nick Fury of the Ultimate Universe does. Nick Fury retires at the end of the series, and his son joins S.H.I.E.L.D. Upon joining S.H.I.E.L.D., Johnson changes his name to his original birth name of Nick Fury Jr., as he and Agent Coulson appear on the Helicarrier in the final page.

Original Sin 

During the Original Sin storyline, Nick Fury is called upon to help investigate the murder of Uatu the Watcher. Fury is attacked and beheaded by the Winter Soldier. When the investigating teams – including Black Panther, Emma Frost, Doctor Strange and the Punisher – attempt to pursue Bucky, they find a space station of unknown origin. "Fury" is revealed to be a highly advanced Life Model Decoy, with the space station containing the real, elderly, Nick Fury and several LMDs. Fury relates an account from 1958, when as a member of U.S. Army Intelligence, he encountered an invasion of alien Tribellians in Kansas. He witnessed Woodrow McCord destroying the home planet of the aliens, before himself being fatally injured. When McCord's partner Howard Stark arrived on the scene, he decided to recruit Fury to continue his work as defender of the planet. Nick Fury accepted, and explains that over the decades he defended the Earth against threats through virtually any means whatsoever, including systematic torture against aliens, genocide against planetary civilizations, and warmongering spanning entire galaxies. The corpses discovered recently by the superhero investigators were threats that Fury had neutralized. Fury reveals that he has rapidly grown elderly and is dying because the Infinity Formula in his body has been depleted. He explains that he chose each of the heroes assembled so that one of them can replace him. His refusal to answer the Black Panther's demand for an explanation of what happened to Uatu leads to a battle between the heroes and the LMDs, during which Fury activates Uatu's eyes. Fury fights off most of the attacking heroes – including revealing an undisclosed secret to Thor that causes him to lose the ability to wield his hammer. Fury confesses that he killed Uatu in potential self-defense after Doctor Midas and the Orb had first attacked him. Fury took one of Uatu's eyes, needing to know who mounted the assault and Uatu's oath preventing him from revealing that information directly. After killing Midas, Fury is shown wandering the Moon in chains and wearing long robes that hide his face from view and unable to interfere as "The Unseen", becoming Uatu's replacement while the Winter Soldier takes his place as Earth's "Man on the Wall".

The Unseen

Following the continuity-changing events of the 2015 miniseries Secret Wars, Fury returned as "the Unseen", advising Odinson of the existence of another hammer. He muses later that, while he is essentially another person from Nick Fury now, he still retains Fury's regret at destroying Thor with a whisper, hoping that the news of the new hammer will help Odinson recover what he once was. Odinson also admits that the secret that made him unworthy was "Gorr was right", referencing how Gorr the God-Butcher believed that no gods were worthy of worship, although Odinson's ally Beta Ray Bill assures him that his willingness to continue fighting for others proves that this does not apply to Odinson.

Later while the Unseen still cannot interfere with the events he is observing, he is able to summon Blink to him and tells her of things going on in the greater multiverse, terrible creatures that are destroying time, space and dimension, and tells her that she is chosen by the device to act as protector of the very fabric of the Multiverse. However, due to this interference in the timestream, a faction of Watchers assaulted him with the objective of ending his involvement, even if it means the end of the Multiverse.

He has also continued Uatu's tradition of observing parallel universes, including observing a reality where Flash Thompson became Spider-Man only to turn himself in after accidentally killing Peter Parker. It is also revealed that the Maker is aware of the Unseen's existence.

In the aftermath of the "Empyre" storyline, the Unseen has watched as the Avengers, the Fantastic Four, the Kree/Skrull Alliance and the Cotati lay rest to the oldest war in the universe. As Quoi is in a Vibranium bondage, Wolverine detects a presence nearby as Thor states that they are being observed by the Unseen. After everyone takes their leave, the Unseen uses his powers to bring the weapons to him. As he inspects the weapons, he finds out that its from ancient technology that predates the Elders of the Universe, the Asgardians and the Celestials. Once he finally realizes that its from the First Race, the Unseen is overcome with energy as a one-eyed Uatu is brought back to life. When the Unseen asks how he is back from the dead and to at least say something, all Uatu can say is "There shall be...a reckoning."

Reckoning War
While reconstructing his home, Uatu learns of how Nick Fury became Unseen by tapping into the Cyclopedia Universum. It revealed that three of Uatu's brothers and sisters broke their non-interference vow by judging Nick Fury and fusing what's left of Uatu with Nick Fury making him a Human/Watcher hybrid that they chained to a rock. After viewing some of the good things that Unseen did and the weapons used by the Cotati which caused Uatu to be revived, he states that the technology did not belong to the Cotati. While he cannot commute Nick Fury's sentence, he does release him from his punishment since he needs an operative to get the job done and makes Nick Fury his herald. The first war is coming and Uatu states that everything and everyone is in peril as Nick Fury accepts his offer to aid him.

During the "Reckoning War" storyline, Nick Fury and Uatu meet up with Mister Fantastic to inform them about the Reckoning. When Uatu tries to appeal to the other Watchers for help, he is condemned to watch the "What If" scenario he never looked at himself in the form of a world where he never interfered by alerting the FF to the coming of Galactus, which ended with the team suffering serious injuries but driving Galactus back and reverse-engineering Galactus's technology to create a new power source for Earth. Uatu is left condemned to watch this world in a loop for the rest of his life as punishment for his interference, but Nick Fury followed the Watchers and managed to realise Uatu from the chair. At the same time, Fury was able to reveal to Uatu that the vision he was being shown ended just before it was revealed that Reed's new energy generator would overload and erase the universe, leaving Uatu shaken but assured that his interference was right after all.

In the conclusion, Uatu builds a new Watchtower for Fury and entrusts him to secure the Ultimate Nullifier as the Unseen and humanity's shield.

Powers, abilities, and equipment
According to the comic books, Nick Fury's aging has been slowed greatly by the Infinity Formula, a serum created by Dr. Berthold Sternberg. Fury was first inoculated with the serum in the 1940s. Fury took the serum annually for many years. Originally Fury had to take the formula annually or the effects would be reversed, allowing his body to reach its actual chronological age. Nick Fury is depicted as an active athletic man despite his advanced chronological age, though writers have sometimes portrayed Fury as being past his prime despite the Infinity Formula as in the Fury and Wolverine graphic novel. As of the "Original Sin" story arc, it is revealed that at some point the Infinity Formula stopped working for him and Fury has only pretended to stop aging by using LMDs.

Fury's injured left eye, though initially minimally affected by a grenade blast during World War II, has over the decades resulted in a 95% loss of vision in this eye. Despite some comments to the contrary, Fury has not had the eye removed, nor bionically enhanced, and he merely covers it with a cosmetic eye-patch to prevent depth perception distortion. He has explained that when needing to disguise himself, he only needs to remove the eyepatch, slip in a contact lens and darken his hair, as everyone always looks for a one-eyed man.

Fury is a seasoned unarmed and armed combat expert, was a heavyweight boxer in the army (during World War II), and holds a black belt in Tae Kwon Do and a brown belt in Jiu Jitsu. He has further honed his unarmed combat skills sparring with Captain America. The character is a combat veteran of three wars, World War II, the Korean War, and the Vietnam War, as well as numerous "military adviser" missions and clandestine operations ("a dozen conflicts you've never even heard of"). He is trained as a paratrooper, Ranger, a demolitions expert, vehicle specialist (including aircraft and seagoing vessels), and a Green Beret.

Fury has access to a wide variety of equipment and weaponry designed by S.H.I.E.L.D. technicians. Fury uses various types of handguns, including a .15 caliber needle gun, a government issue .45 caliber automatic, a captured German Luger in 9mm Parabellum, a modified semi-automatic Walther PPK in 9 mm Parabellum, and the Ingram MAC-10 machine pistol in .45 ACP.

As the director of S.H.I.E.L.D., Fury has access to the entire S.H.I.E.L.D. highly advanced arsenal of weaponry; various air, land, and sea craft provided by S.H.I.E.L.D.; and numerous S.H.I.E.L.D. paraphernalia, including a radio-link tie and a bulletproof suit. Due to his high-ranking status, even when S.H.I.E.L.D. is directed by Tony Stark, Norman Osborn and Steve Rogers, Fury retains access to several S.H.I.E.L.D. warehouses and paraphernalia that are unknown to anyone else but him.

After his transformation into The Unseen, Nick Fury now possesses the same Cosmic Awareness as the Watchers, which grants him the ability to observe different timelines, allowing him to see the past, present and even possible futures of every alternate timelines.

Other versions

1602 
In the 1602 miniseries, Nick Fury appears as Sir Nicholas Fury, Queen Elizabeth I's chief of intelligence. His character was modeled after Elizabeth's real-life spymaster Sir Francis Walsingham.

Avataars 
In the Avataars: Covenant of the Shield miniseries Nick Fury appears as Regent Nicholas, who watches over the throne of Avalon "with his elite guard as its shield".

Back in the USSA 
In the alternate history novel Back in the USSA by Eugene Byrne and Kim Newman, Fury is mentioned as being among a group of military officers hoping to take power from President J. R. Ewing after the collapse of the United Socialist States of America.

Deadpool Merc with a Mouth 
Deadpool visits a universe where the Wild West still exists, and Nick Fury is the sheriff of a town there.

Earth X 
In the Earth X universe, Nick Fury is dead. Several LMDs still exist and fight against Cold War-era communists, such as the current leader of Russia, Piotr Rasputin. One attacks Piotr when he is meeting with Captain America's party.

Ennis 
In the Marvel MAX-imprint miniseries Fury vol. 2, by writer Garth Ennis and penciller Darick Robertson, Fury is a burned-out Cold War veteran unable to cope with the modern world. He is swiftly drawn into a conflict with an old Hydra enemy and the new bureaucratic version of S.H.I.E.L.D. This version continues to appear in Ennis' Punisher series. A 2012 sequel series named Fury: My War Gone By followed Fury's involvement in 1960's anti-Communist military action, including Vietnam and Cuba.

A six-part miniseries named Fury: Peacemaker, written by Ennis, was published in 2006 under the Marvel Knights imprint. It portrays a young Sergeant Fury during World War II, who learns the art of war in the deserts of North Africa with the newly formed British SAS and ultimately joins them on a mission to assassinate an important German general.

House of M 
In the alternate reality of the crossover story arc "House of M", Nick Fury has vanished some time ago. During the mutant purges of the armed forces (which involved outright executions of most of the human field-officers) Nick Fury is kept on as a subservient Drill Instructor, because his talents are too valuable. He makes an enemy of one of his soldiers, Earshot, who has the power to throw his voice with precision over long distances. Earshot uses this power to trick Nick Fury into a trap, seemingly killing him. It is hinted that the trap was actually planned by Wolverine, another of Fury's soldiers.

Marvel Mangaverse 
In the Marvel Mangaverse imprint, Nick Fury, the director of S.H.I.E.L.D., disappears for a time to mastermind the death of 99% of the superhuman population. He is assisted by that universe's Black Cat. It is said, by his mind-controlled victim, Sharon Carter, that the motivation for the superhero deaths is jealousy.

Marvel Zombies 
Nick Fury organizes a resistance against the zombies but is eventually devoured by the zombified Fantastic Four on the Helicarrier. Shortly before he dies, Fury orders Thor to destroy the teleporter built by Tony Stark, despite the fact that the small group of heroes in the room could use it to escape, in order to prevent the Fantastic Four from escaping to other dimensions, effectively saving the multiverse from the zombie plague.

MC2 
In the alternate reality known as the MC2 Universe, Nick Fury is alive and well and is still running S.H.I.E.L.D.

Mutant X 
In the alternate reality of the X-Men-related miniseries Mutant X, Fury leads S.H.I.E.L.D., an anti-mutant policing organization. It is corrupt, and brainwashes its personnel to violently hate all mutants. Fury himself is an extreme megalomaniac, and kills his own men at the slightest questioning of his orders.

Ruins
In the Ruins universe, claiming to still be a government agent, Nick Fury was stationed in Washington, D.C., which had fallen into a state of disrepair after "President X" moved the White House to New York. He met Philip Sheldon, who asked for an interview for a book he was writing. Fury assaulted Sheldon thinking he was a political writer, and insisted that he had no connection with the recently deceased Avengers, then telling him that it was Captain America that introduced him to eating human meat during World War II. After shooting a rabid dog, Fury sat on the corpse until approached and solicited by Jean Grey, a prostitute. Killing her, then igniting a nearby car, he told Sheldon he needed to take a short nap, then put the gun under his chin and pulled the trigger.

The Transformers 
Fury and Dum Dum Dugan appear in the alternate universe toy-license series The Transformers #3 (Jan. 1985).

Ultimate Marvel 

In the Ultimate Marvel Universe, General Nick Fury is African American born in Huntsville, Alabama, with his look and personality closely tailored after actor Samuel L. Jackson who eventually went on to play the live-action adaptation of Nick Fury within the Marvel Cinematic Universe.

Reception 
In 2011, Fury was ranked 33rd in IGN's "Top 100 Comic Book Heroes", and 32nd in their list of "The Top 50 Avengers".

Collected editions

Sgt. Fury and his Howling Commandos 
 Marvel Masterworks: Sgt. Fury
 Vol. 1 collects Sgt. Fury and his Howling Commandos #1–13, 320 pages, February 2006, 
 Vol. 2 collects Sgt. Fury and his Howling Commandos #14–23 and Annual #1, 240 pages, June 2008, 
 Vol. 3 collects Sgt. Fury and his Howling Commandos #24–32 and 'Annual #2, 224 pages, August 2010, 
 Essential Sgt Fury Vol. 1 collects Sgt. Fury and his Howling Commandos #1–23 and Annual #1, 544 pages, November 2011,

Strange Tales / Nick Fury, Agent of S.H.I.E.L.D. 
 Son of Origins of Marvel Comics includes Nick Fury, Agent of S.H.I.E.L.D. story from Strange Tales #135, 249 pages, October 1975, 
 Marvel Masterworks: Nick Fury, Agent of S.H.I.E.L.D.
 Vol. 1 collects Strange Tales #135–153, Tales of Suspense #78, and Fantastic Four #21, 288 pages, September 2007, 
 Vol. 2 collects Strange Tales #154–168 and Nick Fury, Agent of S.H.I.E.L.D. #1–3, 272 pages, December 2009, 
 Vol. 3 collects Nick Fury, Agent of S.H.I.E.L.D. #4–15, The Avengers #72, and Marvel Spotlight #31, 320 pages, December 2011, 
 S.H.I.E.L.D.: The Complete Collection Omnibus collects Strange Tales #135–168, Nick Fury, Agent of S.H.I.E.L.D. #1–15, Fantastic Four #21, Tales of Suspense #78, The Avengers #72, and Marvel Spotlight #31, 960 pages, October 2015,

Nick Fury vs. S.H.I.E.L.D. 
 Marvel Comics Presents: Nick Fury vs. S.H.I.E.L.D. collects Nick Fury vs. S.H.I.E.L.D. #1–6, 1989
 S.H.I.E.L.D.: Nick Fury vs. S.H.I.E.L.D. collects Nick Fury vs. S.H.I.E.L.D. #1–6, 304 pages, December 2011,

Nick Fury, Agent of S.H.I.E.L.D. vol. 3 
 Nick Fury, Agent of S.H.I.E.L.D. Classic
 Vol. 1 collects Nick Fury, Agent of S.H.I.E.L.D. vol. 3 #1–11, 272 pages, July 2012, 
 Vol. 2 collects Nick Fury, Agent of S.H.I.E.L.D. vol. 3 #12–23, 288 pages, February 2015, 
 Vol. 3 collects Nick Fury, Agent of S.H.I.E.L.D. vol. 3 #24–38, 288 pages, June 2015,

Secret Warriors 
 Secret Warriors Vol. 1: Nick Fury, Agent of Nothing collects Secret Warriors #1–6, 184 pages, September 2009,

In other media

See also 
 Nick's World
 Nick Fury's Howling Commandos
 Sgt. Rock

References

External links 

 Nick Fury at Marvel.com
 Marvel Directory: Nick Fury
 Nick Fury, Agent of S.H.I.E.L.D. at Don Markstein's Toonopedia. Archived from the original on August 31, 2015.
 Comics 101 (column, March 3, 2004): "Secret Agent, Man", by Scott Tipton
 E. Favata's Comic Book Movies: Nick Fury
 The Grand Comics Database
 Iron Man Movie on IMDB
 
 Sneak Peek TV: Nick Fury
 

 
Avengers (comics) characters
Characters created by Jack Kirby
Characters created by Stan Lee
Comics characters introduced in 1963
Fictional characters from New York City
Fictional characters missing an eye
Fictional characters with slowed ageing
Fictional Central Intelligence Agency personnel
Fictional colonels
Fictional Korean War veterans
Fictional military strategists
Fictional sergeants
Fictional spymasters
Fictional United States Army Rangers personnel
Fictional Vietnam War veterans
Fictional World War II veterans
Howling Commandos
Marvel Comics American superheroes
Marvel Comics male superheroes
Marvel Comics martial artists
Marvel Comics mutates
S.H.I.E.L.D. agents
Spy comics
Superhero film characters